"Wide is My Motherland", also known as "Song of the Motherland", is a famous patriotic song of Russia and the former Soviet Union. The music was composed by Isaac Dunaevsky and the words were written by Vasily Lebedev-Kumach. The song was first featured in the classic Soviet film "Circus" in 1936.

History 

The song made its début in the 1936 film Circus, starring Lyubov Orlova and Sergei Stolyarov. The film depicts the story of an American woman who flees from racism in the United States after giving birth to an African-American child. She comes to the USSR to sing as part of an act in the circus, and soon falls in love with a performance director Ivan Petrovich Martinov. As she becomes assimilated into her new surroundings, her love blossoms into a love not only for Martinov but for the Soviet motherland itself, the ideals that have refined it, and the newly found freedoms of Soviet society. The melody and chorus of the song appear throughout the film, and both parts of the final stanza are sung at the end where all the characters are seen marching in a May Day parade on Red Square.

The song gained immediate popularity. A full three-stanza recording was published in 1937. In 1939, the opening chorus notes played on vibraphone became the official call sign of Soviet radio. Later on, however, during the period of de-Stalinization, the second stanza was dropped due to its mention of Joseph Stalin. It was replaced with a new stanza emphasizing comradeship and proletarian internationalism. The song was also translated into several other languages of Eastern Bloc countries, including German and Hungarian. Since the dissolution of the Soviet Union, the song remains a popular patriotic tune in the Russian Federation.

Lyrics 

"*" Omitted during de-Stalinization

See also 
Culture of the Soviet Union
Cinema of the Soviet Union
Russian Culture

References

External links 
Mention on the Russian National Anthems site - 
Sheet music - 

1936 songs
Russian songs
Soviet songs
Russian patriotic songs
Songs about Russia
Songs about Joseph Stalin
Compositions by Isaak Dunayevsky